In 4-dimensional geometry, the cuboctahedral pyramid is bounded by one cuboctahedron on the base, 6 square pyramid, and 8 triangular pyramid cells which meet at the apex. It has 38 faces: 32 triangles and 6 squares. It has 32 edges, and 13 vertices.

Since a cuboctahedron's circumradius is equal to its edge length, the triangles must be taller than equilateral to create a positive height.

The dual to the cuboctahedral pyramid is a rhombic dodecahedral pyramid, seen as a rhombic dodecahedral base, and 12 rhombic pyramids meeting at an apex.

References

External links

 Richard Klitzing, Axial-Symmetrical Edge Facetings of Uniform Polyhedra

4-polytopes